Baby's Gang were an Italian teen pop band formed in Italy in 1983. The group comprised thirteen teenagers fronted by future italo disco star Ivana Spagna. They are mostly known for their hit single "Happy Song".

History 

Baby's Gang was formed in 1983 by producer Larry Pinagnoli and consisted of thirteen teenagers led by vocalist Ivana Spagna. Pinagnoli, Spagna and Otto Bacciocci were responsible for writing the majority of Baby Gang's material. The signature sound of the band was a dance beat that crossed over between Italo-Disco and Electro-Pop. Baby's Gang were signed by Memory Records, spearheaded by producer Alessandro Zanni, and released a handful of successful singles, including their major hit "Happy Song". In 1985 German disco band Boney M recorded a cover version that made the song into a European hit. Following the release of their first album, Challenger (1986), Spagna went on to have a solo career with the song "Easy Lady". Baby's Gang disbanded at the end of 1988. Of the group, Denise Bonfanti subsequently enjoyed a mildly successful career as vocalist.

Discography

Albums 
 Challenger (1985)
 Child Disco (1989)

Singles 
 1983: "Happy Song"
 1984: "Challenger"
 1985: "America"
 1985: "Jamin"
 1985: "Step by Step"
 1986: "My Little Japanese Boy"
 1988: "Disco Maniac"

References

External links 

 

1983 establishments in Italy
1989 disestablishments in Italy
Italian musical groups
Italo disco groups
Musical groups established in 1983
Musical groups disestablished in 1989
Memory Records artists
ZYX Music artists
Musical groups from Milan